Kalyi Jag may refer to:

Kalyi Jag (album), 2000 debut album to Ektomorf
Kalyi Jag (group), a Hungarian Romani folk music group